"Fee-fi-fo-fum" is the first line of a historical quatrain (or sometimes couplet) famous for its use in the classic English fairy tale "Jack and the Beanstalk". The poem, as given in Joseph Jacobs' 1890 rendition, is as follows:
  

Fee-fi-fo-fum,
I smell the blood of an Englishman,
Be he alive, or be he dead
I'll grind his bones to make my bread.

Though the rhyme is tetrametric, it follows no consistent metrical foot; however, the lines correspond roughly to a monosyllabic tetrameter, a dactylic tetrameter, a trochaic tetrameter, and an iambic tetrameter respectively. The poem has historically made use of assonant half rhyme.

Origin
The rhyme appears in the 1596 pamphlet "Haue with You to Saffron-Walden" written by Thomas Nashe, who mentions that the rhyme was already old and its origins obscure:

In William Shakespeare's play King Lear (c. 1605), in Act III, Scene IV, the character Edgar referring to the legend of Childe Rowland exclaims:

Fie, foh, and fum,
I smell the blood of a British man.

The verse in King Lear makes use of the archaic word "fie", used to express disapproval. This word is used repeatedly in Shakespeare's works: King Lear shouts, "Fie, fie, fie! pah, pah!", and in Antony and Cleopatra, Mark Antony exclaims, "O fie, fie, fie!"

The earliest known printed version of the Jack the Giant-Killer tale appears in The history of Jack and the Giants (Newcastle, 1711) and this, and later versions (found in chapbooks), include renditions of the poem, recited by the giant Thunderdell:

Fee, fau, fum,
I smell the blood of an English man,
Be alive, or be he dead,
I'll grind his bones to make my bread.

Fe, Fi, Fo, Fum.
I smell the blood of an Englishman,
Be he living, or be he dead,
I’ll grind his bones to mix my bread.

Charles Mackay proposes in The Gaelic Etymology of the Languages of Western Europe that the seemingly meaningless string of syllables "Fa fe fi fo fum" is actually a coherent phrase of ancient Gaelic, and that the complete quatrain covertly expresses the Celts' cultural detestation of the invading Angles and Saxons:

"behold!" or "see!"
 Fe from Fiadh (fee-a) "food";
 Fi from fiú "good to eat"
 Fo from fogh (fó) "sufficient" and 
 Fum from feum "hunger".

Thus "Fa fe fi fo fum!" becomes "Behold food, good to eat, sufficient for my hunger!"

See also
 Fe, Fi, Fo, Fum, and Phooey, five mice who traveled to and circled the Moon on Apollo 17 in 1972, four nicknamed after the poem
 "Fe Fi Fo Fum" is a 7" single by The Eccentics, Pye Records 7N.15850, May 1965
 "Fee-Fi-Fo-Fum" is a composition by jazz saxophonist Wayne Shorter from his 1966 album Speak No Evil
 "Fee Fi Fo" is a song by the Irish band The Cranberries, from their 1999 album Bury the Hatchet.
 Ablaut reduplication
 Baba Yaga, in Slavic folklore, also detects human presence by smell.

References

English poems